Johannes Felsner (born 10 October 1998) is an Austrian football player. He plays for FC Schladming.

Club career
He made his Austrian Football First League debut for Kapfenberger SV on 14 March 2017 in a game against FC Liefering.

References

External links
 

1998 births
People from Liezen District
Living people
Austrian footballers
Kapfenberger SV players
2. Liga (Austria) players
Association football defenders
Footballers from Styria